is a Japanese alternative rock band. The band started out as a duo with Atsushi Horie (vocals/guitar) and Shinpei Nakayama (drums) in 1998. They established an independent label named Ghost Records in 2002. Hidekazu Hinata joined the band as bassist in 2003, giving the band a heavier sound. In October of the same year they released a single, "Traveling Gargoyle" from Toshiba EMI.

Straightener have performed at numerous festivals and live tours. The band toured all over Japan during their Linear tour in 2007, as well as performing a joint tour in December 2013 with Asian Kung-Fu Generation to celebrate both bands' 10-year anniversaries. Both bands performed in Korea, Singapore, and Taiwan along with a local band from each country.

Members
Atsushi Horie – guitar, vocals, keyboards
Also plays guitar and sings for the band FULLARMOR. Has a solo project called "ent", best known for the Solanin film soundtrack.
Shinpei Nakayama – drums
Also played drums for the band The Predators, with Sawao Yamanaka (guitar, The Pillows), and Jiro (bass, Glay). Drummer for the band another sunnyday and Zantö.
Hidekazu Hinata – bass
Former bassist of ART-SCHOOL and Zazen Boys. Also plays bass for the bands FULLARMOR and Nothing's Carved in Stone.
 Jun Ōyama - guitar
Joined Straightener on October 1, 2008. Also plays guitar for another sunnyday. Former guitarist for the band ART-SCHOOL.

Discography

Albums

Singles/EPs
"Senshi no Shikabane no March" (2000) 
"ANOTHER DIMENSIONAL" (2000) 
SILVER RECORD (2002) 
Silent Film Soundtrack (2003) 
"TRAVELING GARGOYLE" (2003) 
"TENDER" (2004) 
"KILLER TUNE / PLAY THE STAR GUITAR" (2004) 
"THE REMAINS" (2005) 
"Melodic Storm" (2006) 
"BERSERKER TUNE" (2006) 
"SIX DAY WONDER" (2007) 
"TRAIN" (2007) 
"Little Miss Weekend" (2008) 
"Lightning" (2009) 
"Clone / Donkey Boogie Dodo" (2009) (The Shock Labyrinth Theme Song (CLONE))
"Man-Like Creatures" (2010) 
"VANDALISM / SILLY PARADE" (2011) 
"YOU and I / Hitsuji no Mure wa Oka o Noboru" (2011) 
"From Noon Till Dawn" (2012) (Yūsha Yoshihiko to Akuryou no Kagi Opening Theme)
"Super Magical Illusion" (2014) 
"Winter Sun / The World Record" (2014) 
"The Place Has No Name" (2015) (Fuben na Benriya Opening Theme)
"Inochi no Ato ni Saita Hana" (2015) 
"DAY TO DAY" (2015) 
"Sea Glass" (2016) 
"Akari" (2017) 
"Boy Friend" (2018) 
"The Future Is Now / Time Leap" (2018) (Digimon ReArise Theme Song (The Future Is Now))
"Braver" (2018) (Angolmois: Record of Mongol Invasion Opening Theme) 
"Spiral" (2019)
"Graffiti" (2020)
"Sakebu Hoshi" (2020)
"Sayonara dake ga Oshiete Kureta" (2020)
"Crank Up (2021)

DVDs
BLACK STAR LUSTER (2005) 
EMOTION PICTURE SOUNDTRACK (2006) 
Remember Our Drinking Songs -Hello Dear Deadman Tour 2006 (2006) 
Linear Motor City (2007) 
Emotion Picture Soundtrack 2  (2009)
NEXUS TOUR FINAL (2009)
The Parade of Creatures (2010) 
LONG WAY TO NOWHERE TOUR (2012) 
ETERNAL ROCK BAND -21st CENTURY ROCK BAND TOUR 2013- (2014) 
Step Into My World Tour 2016 (2017)
21st ANNIVERSARY ROCK BAND (2019)

Split albums
DRAGORUM with The Pete Best (2001) 
untitled split cassette tape with ART-SCHOOL (2002)

References

External links
Straightener's official site
Straightener's fansite
Straightener forum

Musical groups established in 1998
Japanese alternative rock groups
Japanese indie rock groups
Musical groups from Tokyo